Middlesex East was a former federal electoral district in Ontario, Canada, represented in the House of Commons of Canada from 1867 to 1968. It was created by the British North America Act of 1867, which divided the County of Middlesex into three ridings: Middlesex North, Middlesex West and Middlesex East.

In 1882, the East Riding of the county of Middlesex it was defined as consisting of the townships of London, West Nissouri, North Dorchester and South Dorchester, the town of London East and the villages of London West and Springfield.

In 1903, the east riding was defined to consist of the townships of Dorchester North, London, Nissouri West and Westminster.

In 1914, the county of Middlesex was divided into two ridings, Middlesex East and Middlesex West. The east riding consisted of the townships of Dorchester North, London, Nissouri West, Westminster and Biddulph, the village of Lucan and those portions of the city of London not included in London city riding.

In 1924, it was redefined to consist of the part of the county of Middlesex lying east of and including the townships of Biddulph, London and Westminster, and those portions of the city of London not included in London city riding.

In 1947, it was redefined to consist of the townships of North Dorchester, London, West Nissouri and Westminster, and the eastern part of the City of London.

In 1952,  it was redefined to consist of the Townships of Dorchester North, Nissouri West, Westminster, the eastern part of the Township of London, and the eastern part of the City of London.

The electoral district was abolished in 1966 when it was redistributed between London East, London West and Middlesex ridings.

It was re-created in 1976 from parts of Huron—Middlesex, London East and Middlesex—London—Lambton ridings, but was renamed London—Middlesex in 1977 before any election was held in the riding.

Members of Parliament

This riding elected the following members of the House of Commons of Canada:

Election results

On Mr. Willson being unseated on petition, 15 December 1874:
 

On election being declared void, 21 January 1892:
 

On Mr. Elson's death, 11 June 1913:

See also 

 List of Canadian federal electoral districts
 Past Canadian electoral districts

References

External links 
Riding history 1867-1966 from the Library of Parliament
Riding history 1976-1977 from the Library of Parliament

Former federal electoral districts of Ontario